Cora caraana is a species of basidiolichen in the family Hygrophoraceae. It was formally described as a new species in 2016 by Robert Lücking, Suzana Maria de Azevedo Martins, and Fabiane Lucheta. The specific epithet caraana refers to the type locality in Caraá (Rio Grande do Sul). It is only known known to occur at this location, where it grows as an epiphyte on tree branches in mountainous rainforests.

References

caraana
Lichen species
Lichens described in 2016
Lichens of Central America
Taxa named by Robert Lücking
Basidiolichens